Seán O'Neill (born 1972 in Murroe, County Limerick, Ireland) is an Irish retired sportsperson.  He played hurling with his local club Murroe-Boher and was a member of the Limerick senior inter-county team from 1993 until 1997.

References

1972 births
Living people
Murroe-Boher hurlers
Limerick inter-county hurlers